The 2nd Siberian Army Corps was an Army corps in the Imperial Russian Army.

Composition
1905:
6th Siberian Rifle Division
8th Siberian Rifle Division
1914:
4th Siberian Rifle Division
5th Siberian Rifle Division

Part of
1st Manchurian Army: 1904-1906 
10th Army: 1914
12th Army: 1914, 1915 - 1916, 1916 - 1917
3rd Army: 1915
2nd Army: 1916
5th Army: 1916
1st Army: 1916

Commanders
1900-1901: Alexander Kaulbars
1901-1902: Georgii Stackelberg
1903-1906: Mikhail Zasulich
1906-1908: Vladimir Vasilyevich Smirnov
June-October 1915: Radko Dimitriev

References 

Corps of the Russian Empire